The Platinum Collection is the second compilation album released in May 2005 by Australian singer Peter Andre, containing hits from early in his career. The album was a budget release, therefore ineligible to chart.

Track listing

References

Peter Andre albums
2005 greatest hits albums
Compilation albums by Australian artists